Handelsman is a German surname meaning "merchant". Notable people with the surname include:

J. B. Handelsman (1922–2007)
Jo Handelsman, American professor of molecular, cellular and developmental biology at Yale University 
Marceli Handelsman (1882–1945)
Michael Handelsman, American historian
Steve Handelsman (born 1948)
Walt Handelsman (born 1956)
Mark Handelsman (born 1961)

German-language surnames
Jewish surnames
Yiddish-language surnames
Occupational surnames